WorldCall Telecom Limited is a Pakistani telecommunication and multimedia service provider which is a subsidiary of Omani company Omantel. It is based in Lahore, Pakistan. 

It was founded by Salman Taseer in 1996.

In 2008, it was acquired by Omantel for an undisclosed amount.

History 
WorldCall was founded in 1996 by Salman Taseer.

References

External links
 Official Website 

Telecommunications companies established in 1996
Internet service providers of Pakistan
Cable television companies of Pakistan
Pakistani subsidiaries of foreign companies
2008 mergers and acquisitions
Mergers and acquisitions of Pakistani companies
Companies based in Lahore
Companies listed on the Pakistan Stock Exchange